National Van Lines, Inc. is a privately held American moving and relocation company based in Broadview, Illinois with agents in 48 states and service partners around the world. The company’s services include residential and commercial moving and storage domestically and internationally. National Van Lines has been designated a Pro Mover company by the American Moving & Storage Association.

History
The company was begun in 1929 by F.J. McKee, who originally used a single wagon to deliver ice and coal to Chicago-area customers. He eventually branched out his business, moving vaudeville sets for acting troupes as well as individual acts, including Charlie Chaplin. McKee had a fleet of moving trucks.

McKee’s son, F.L. McKee, took over the business in 1931, and the company was incorporated in 1934. By 1945, the company was one of only five operators designated to service the entire United States. McKee’s daughter, Maureen Beal, became CEO when he died in 1993 at the age of 91. The company experienced 20% growth every year for five consecutive years when Beal took over.

Company overview

National Van Lines employs over 140 people in its Broadview headquarters. The company serves an average of 20,000 customers per year and its trucks log approximately 8.5 million miles a year performing residential and commercial moves.

Under CEO Maureen Beal, National Van Lines grew from $45 million in revenue when she took over in 1993 to $105 million in 2013. A breast cancer survivor, Beal is a strong advocate for women’s health issues as well as women entrepreneurs. She serves on the board of directors of the American Moving & Storage Association, is a Benedictine University trustee and is Chairman of the Board of Directors for Marianjoy Rehabilitation Hospital. Maureen Beal retired as National Van Lines Chairman & CEO December 2019.

Tim Helenthal assumed the company's Chairman & CEO position January 2020, after serving seven years as the company’s President & COO. Starting with National Van Lines 26 years earlier, he was vice president of agency services for sister company, National Forwarding Co., and manager of that company’s Total Quality Assurance Program. When Tim started as a one-man department at National Van Lines, roughly 20 people worked in his division. During his 18 years in that sector, the division grew to nearly 70 employees. Throughout his tenure, National Van Lines has set (and broken) sales records; one division even tripled its sales.

Recognition
 From 2010 to 2013, the Chicago Tribune named National Van Lines at one of the "Top 100 Workplaces" in the Chicago area.
 On June 21, 2011, the Chicago Tribune reported that the company has changed its structure to become an employee stock ownership plan (ESOP-owned) entity.
 Crain’s Chicago Business magazine named National Van Lines one of the top 10 woman-owned businesses in Illinois in 2012.
 The Better Business Bureau of Chicago and Northern Illinois rates National Van Lines as an A+ Accredited Business.

Charity work 
National Van Lines supports Robert Wyland, a world-renowned artist who is devoted to environmental conservation. The company has joined with the Wyland Foundation to provide educational outreach tours, as well as public art, to families across the United States and Canada. The company also partnered with the Wyland Foundation to bring the Clean Water Mobile Learning Experience to students across the U.S. and Mexico. The Experience features a theater and interactive stations that educate students on the impact humans have on various watershed habitats.

The company is also an active participant in the Windy City Rubber Ducky Derby, raising funds for Special Olympics Illinois as well as serving as long-time supporters for the American Cancer Society’s Relay for Life.

In 2015, National Van Lines teamed up with Move For Hunger, a non-profit organization that partners with the relocation industry to reduce food waste and fight hunger.

References

External links

Queens Movers
Moving Company
Moving & Clearing

Truck rental
1929 establishments in Illinois
Moving companies of the United States
Companies based in Cook County, Illinois
Transport companies established in 1929